East Province was an electoral province of the Legislative Council of Western Australia between 1894 and 1950. It elected three members throughout its existence.

Members

References
 David Black (2014), The Western Australian Parliamentary Handbook (Twenty-Third Edition), pp. 221–222

Former electoral provinces of Western Australia
1894 establishments in Australia
1950 disestablishments in Australia